Franchise Tax Board of California v. Hyatt (short: Hyatt II), 578 U.S. ___ (2016), was a United States Supreme Court case in which the Court held that the Nevada rule that does not extend the same immunities to agencies of other states as it does to its own is effectively a "policy of hostility", which is unconstitutional under the Full Faith and Credit Clause. The Court split equally on the question whether Nevada v. Hall should be overruled, effectively upholding it.

References

External links
 

United States Supreme Court cases
United States Supreme Court cases of the Roberts Court
2016 in United States case law